Michele Cassou  (born 27 September 1942) is an American painter, teacher and author.

Biography
Cassou, a French-born American citizen, is using painting as a tool for self-discovery, and for exploring the spiritual dimensions of the creative process via the "Point Zero Painting" technique. Her very early paintings are included in the Collection de l'art brut, Jean Dubuffet's collection permanently on display in Lausanne.

She has been teaching since her early twenties, first in Paris, then Canada, Ottawa and Montreal, then in the United States.

Presently, she teaches the Point Zero Method under the name Michele Cassou Painting Workshops. She conducts workshops in the San Francisco Area, at the Esalen Institute in Big Sur California, at the New York Open Center and at the Mabel Dodge Luhan House in  Taos New Mexico, in various Zen centers and other locations throughout the United States and Europe.

Early life and education
Michele Cassou was born in 1942 in Marseilles, the daughter of a Jewish mother and a father who was a Catholic French officer. The family fled to Morocco during the war, where Michele spent the first three years of her life, not meeting her father until the end of the war. Then with her mother she moved to the town of Hyères on the Mediterranean. She started to draw and paint when she was just five years old.

At the age of 14 her growing family, now including seven children, moved to Paris where Michele attended Helen Boucher High School. Shortly before she turned 17 her family moved to Algeria to join her father who was serving as an officer in the Algerian war. Michele finished high school in Algeria. At the end of Micheleʼs last year of high school the family moved back to Paris.

She subsequently enrolled in traditional Parisian art classes and joined  L’Academie du Jeudi, a free expression studio for children, created and run by Arno Stern. She remained at the studio for almost four years, where she also came into contact with Krisnamurti through his books, which have influenced her life and teaching. She began teaching painting in her early twenties.

Michele was married in the early 1960s and in 1965, gave birth to her only son, Phillipe.

During the 1968 student uprisings in Paris Michele was asked to paint a huge mural in one of the amphitheaters of La Sorbonne.

Within a few years the family moved to Canada.  After seven years of marriage, divorced, Michele returned to the South of France for a year. In a small village Nans les pins, she studied Yoga and meditation. She then moved back to Canada, and soon after the United States where she settled in California.

In 1978, she founded The Painting Experience Studio in San Francisco. This studio offered classes and workshops year-round for 11 years; in 1996 The Painting Experience Studio closed, and its name moved to different teachings. She continues to paint and teach workshops, write and train teachers in the Point Zero Method throughout the United States and Europe.

Transformative work
Cassou and her work have received praise by other artists and authors.

According to her own words, "I can never possess my painting, I have to rediscover it every time. I can never say that I know how to paint, because there is no way to grasp it, the only thing I can do is forget what I know." She also explained that "Now is the time to put the last stroke on the painting. I let myself slide all the way into it. I feel its full embrace. I stand in the most intimate fashion, in the closest possible way, at the center of my own passion. I am ecstatic. God's beauty fills me. My soul is full."

Additional references in books
 Kathleen Fury. 1996. "Just Imagine." New Choices magazine. p. 53.
 Mary Jane Casavant. 1996. "If you ask us." Common Boundary magazine. p. 46.
 Emmet Fox. 1997. "The Magic of Spontaneous Expression." Science of Mind Vol.70 No.4. pp. 12–17.
 Alejandra Nash and Phyllis Lane. 1998. Unleashing Creativity book and documentary film about the power of being creative.
 Tona Pearce Myers, editor.1999. The Soul of Creativity. "Inside the Heartbeat of Creation", pp. 2–6. Publisher: New World Library. .
 Gail McMeekin. 2000. The 12 secrets of Highly Creative Women. pp. 14, 23, 58, 64–65. Publisher: Conari Press. .
 David Riklan. 2004. Top 101 Experts Who Help Us Improve Our Lives p. 374. Publisher: Self-improvement online, Inc. .
 Anne Devillard. 2009. Heilung Aus Der Mitte. (Healing from the Heart). pp. 25–33. Publisher: Driediger. .
 Kate Appel. 2009. Two Rivers: Awakening to Your Inner Aliveness Through Painting. pp. 8–9. Publisher: Author House.  .

TV, Radio, and Web Interviews
 November  1978. "The Joe Bavarasco Show." KMO Channel 20, San Francisco.
 November 18, 1992.  San Francisco:  "In Search of the Miraculous", an interview of Michele Cassou by Richard Liebow. 28 minutes.
 November 22, 1996. Seattle interview with Rosemary Broccoli. "The Creative Process."
 November 1997. Washington: Wisdom Channel Television: "Creative Arts & Spirituality: Life, Paint and Passion with interview with Michele Cassou." 30 minutes  (1019).
 January 5, 2005. Charleston: "The Parents Journal with Bobbi Conner."  "Creative Kids Play", a radio interview with Michele Cassou.

Conferences
 July 9, 1978. The Northern California Art Therapy Symposium, 4th annual. San Francisco.
 March 18, 1979. New Earth Exposition. Brooks Hall, San Francisco.
 March 8–11, 2000. The Ontario Convention Center, Ontario, California.  Starshine, Encinatas: "Come to the Edge Conference." Michele presented  "Life, Paint and Passion."
 October–November 2001. Germany. Kongreg-Zentrum Garmisch-Partenkirchen International Conference: "Soul in Medicine." Michele presented "Creativity and Healing."
 November 15, 2002. Oakland, California.  The Sophia Center at Holy Names College. Michele presented "Creativity and Spirituality."
 September 12, 2004. San Francisco Yerba Buena Center for the Arts. "The Healing Power of Art." Michele presented "Paint, Passion and the Creative Power."
May 2010 w/ host(s) Dr. Carol Stalcup
 June 17, 2011.  Author and workshop facilitator Michele Cassou. Teleseminar. Posted by Gabrielle Javier-Cerulli.

Author and Workshop Facilitator Michele Cassou Teleseminar.
 July 8, 2011.  "Intuition comes from the whole person, from a place that includes the conscious and the unconscious. The total result of all feelings and perceptions manifests spontaneously through intuition. Intuition gives expression to the feelings; that expression is unique and perfectly fitted to the needs of the moment."
 July 2011 Daily Inspiration: Michele Cassou
"If you do not listen to your intuition, it will stop talking to you. Your intuition is like a sensitive friend. If you question it, censor it, judge it, it gets hurt and becomes silent."

Exhibitions
 "The Inside World", September 22, 1971. University of Ottawa, Ottawa, Ontario, Canada. French: Bourse pour realization d'une fresque. English: Grant for realization of a fresco, University of Ottawa, Canada. Solo.
 "Michele Cassou."  1972. Mitchell Gallery, Toronto, Ontario, Canada. Solo.
 "New Invention the Collection d'l Art Brut de Lausanne of Jean Dubuffet. Museo de Navarra, Spain. November 1996–January 1997.
Exhibition at Atelier Veron, Paris, November 2019

Collection
Jean Dubuffet Collection. L'Art Brut Lausanne.

Books
 Life, Paint and Passion: Reclaiming the magic of spontaneous expression, 1995, Penguin Putnam Inc. 
 Questions: To awaken your creative power to the fullest, June 2009 
 Point Zero; Creativity without limits, 2001, Penguin Putnam Inc. 
 The Buddhist Art Doctor: Prescriptions for creative and Non-Creative seekers, September 2002, @Michele Cassou Workshops.
 Kids Play: Igniting Children's Creativity, 2004, Penguin Group (USA) Inc. 
 Teachers That Dare: Using the creative process to teach the creative process, June 2011, DeHart's Publishing USA 
Answering the Call of Creativity, 2016, Create Space 
A Graphic Approach to Creativity, 2017; 
Painting Between Worlds: A Life of Creative Passion ISBN  1650986947

VIDEOS
 "Birth of a Process." By Michele Cassou. 1999 DVD-R.
 "Creativity and Passion" ~ A Lecture By Michele Cassou. VHS Tape or DVD-R. 1999.
 Point Zero: Insights and Images. Michele Cassou 2003 DVD-R.
 "The Flowering of Children's Creativity." Discovering the natural evolution of children's creativity and helping them find the joy of self-expression. by Michele Cassou. 2006 DVD-R
 "Awakening of the Mystic." by Michele Cassou. 2009  DvD-R
 "Body, Sexuality, and Spirit" by Michele Cassou. 2010 DVD-R

References

External links 
 Michele Cassou, founder of the Painting Experience leads groups in North America and Europe.
 There is a strong belief that technique, knowledge and training are necessary to paint well.
 Mabel Dodge Luhan House Workshops. Michele Cassou is the founder of an original approach to creative painting as a tool for self-discovery.
 Conversation with Michele Cassou "Creativity Without Limits" by Dr. Carol Stalcup.
 Michele Cassou"At Point Zero, your will surrenders and you move into the greater picture of your life. You are in a state of awakened surrender.
 Studio in San Francisco and student of Michele Cassou, the founder of process painting. by Patricia Hoban.
 Ausdrucksmalen nach Arno Stern und Michelee Cassou.

1942 births
Living people
20th-century American painters
21st-century American painters
French emigrants to the United States
Artists from Paris
American women painters
20th-century American women artists
21st-century American women artists